Stockholm Arlanda Airport  is an international airport located in the Sigtuna Municipality of Sweden, near the town of Märsta,  north of Stockholm and nearly  south-east of Uppsala. The airport is located within Stockholm County and the province of Uppland. It is the largest airport in Sweden and the third-largest airport in the Nordic countries. The airport is the major gateway to international air travel for large parts of Sweden. Arlanda Airport was used by nearly 27 million passengers in 2017, with 21.2 million international passengers and 5.5 million domestic.

Stockholm Arlanda Airport is the larger of Stockholm's two airports. The other, Stockholm–Bromma, is located north-west of the city's centre but can be used only by a small number of smaller aircraft. Stockholm Arlanda serves as a major hub for Scandinavian Airlines and Norwegian Air Shuttle.

History

The airport was first used in 1959 but only for practice flights. It opened for limited civil traffic in 1960, and in 1962 the official opening ceremony took place. It was used from the start for intercontinental traffic because the runway at Bromma was too short. Scandinavian Airlines started using Douglas DC-8s on North American routes. The airport was also used very early by Pan American World Airways. The name Arlanda was decided after a competition prior to the airport opening. It is derived from Arland, an old name for the parish Ärlinghundra (now Husby-Ärlinghundra in Märsta) where the airport is situated. The '-a' was added in analogy with other Swedish place names ending with -landa and also plays on the Swedish verb "landa", which means "to land". The 1960s and 1970s saw increases in traffic with scheduled traffic and charter traffic. The Boeing 747 jumbojet started to be used in the 1970s, both on one-stop scheduled flights to New York and on weekend nonstop charters to the Canary Islands. Domestic flights to Gothenburg, Malmö, Luleå and Kiruna were operated by SAS DC-9s from Arlanda since they were considered too noisy to be used at downtown Bromma. The rest of domestic traffic operated out of Bromma and all international traffic out of Arlanda.

In 1983 the domestic traffic operated by Linjeflyg moved from Bromma to Arlanda, using the terminal now known as Terminal 4. In 1990 two new domestic terminals called "Domestic 2 and 3" were built south of the first domestic terminal. In 1992 the terminal 2 was partly abandoned because of traffic decrease. It started to be used for international traffic the year after, and the main domestic and international terminals were renumbered into 4 and 5. The third runway was built between 1998 and 2002. However, a recession in 2002 delayed its opening until 2003. At that time protests were raised by people living under its flight path in the municipality of Upplands Väsby. Traffic has recovered since and is now showing healthy increases but the third runway is only used during peak hours for environmental reasons. In September 2010 the first Airbus A380 superjumbo landed at the airport.

In early 2014, Swedavia announced plans for further expansions of the airport terminal complex, including the construction of an additional pier for Terminal 5 in order to better accommodate larger aircraft such as the Airbus A380 and Boeing 747-8 and address forecasts of rising passenger numbers. The plans were approved by the Environmental Court of Appeals in December 2014, and construction was scheduled to commence in the spring of 2015.

In the spring of 2020, most flights were cancelled due to the COVID-19 pandemic. SAS decided to from 6 April 2020 fly only four domestic departures and four domestic arrivals from Arlanda, plus some international while Norwegian cancelled all flights from Arlanda except to Oslo. Terminal 2, 3 and 4 closed and terminal 5 handled all passengers during this period (March 2020 – October 2021) The passenger figures were 97.7% lower in April 2020 than in April 2019. The figured picked up later, but were early 2021 still over 80% less per month than 2019.

In the spring of 2022, passenger figures rose again to more normal levels. This caused capacity problems, especially in the security check, because most of its staff were fired due to the pandemic recession, and it takes time to find and get security approval for and educate new staff. Terminal 4 could not open because transfer between it and Terminal 5 required a security check, and the security check was congested already, so Terminal 5 got itself congested. Swedavia built a new pedestrian tunnel between the two terminals bypassing the security check area. It opened together with Terminal 4 at the end of June 2022.

Facilities

Runways
Arlanda has three runways: Runway 1 (01L/19R), Runway 2 (08/26) and Runway 3 (01R/19L). As indicated, runways 1 and 3 are parallel runways that can be operated independently of one another. Runways 1 and 3 are equipped with CAT III systems for instrument landings. The airport can handle simultaneous take offs and landings using runways 1 and 3 at the same time. Simultaneous aircraft takeoffs and landings can be performed in instrument meteorological conditions (IMC). Runway 3 (01R/19L) is reached from the main terminal area via taxiway bridges constructed to be able to handle the heaviest and largest aircraft in traffic, although its length practically limits this. Since runway 3 (01R/19L) is located at a distance from the terminals, a deicing area is placed close to the runway to avoid long waits between deicing and take off in winter conditions. Another deicing area is located in connection with the southern ramp area close to the take off positions at runway 01L. There are high speed taxiway exits from all runways, except runway 08, to enable aircraft to exit the runways quickly after landing. That increases runway capacity during rush hours. Use of parallel taxiways around the terminal area separates arriving and departing traffic. Arlanda can handle all aircraft types in service including the Airbus A380.

Terminals
The airport has four terminals. As of 2022, three terminals are in use, and there is no real separation of domestic and international flights anymore. From 1992 to 2019 terminals 2 and 5 were used for international flights, and 3 and 4 for domestic flights. There has been a modification of usage due to the COVID-19 pandemic when only terminal 5 was used, and during the capacity build up of 2022, which is still not settled and is subject of change.

The central building, Arlanda North, opened in late 2003, connecting terminal 5 with the newly built Pier F. Between terminals 4 and 5 is a shopping and restaurant area with a railway station below, called "Sky City", which is outside the security check area on the landside to cater to the needs of passengers and visitors to the airport. In 2022 terminals 4 and 5 were connected on the airside after the security check area, making them more connected to each other.

There are hotels at the airport in connection with the terminals (only outside the security check and passport check area) and in its surroundings. There are also conference facilities at the airport.

Terminal 2 – International (Arlanda South)
Terminal 2 (gates 61–72) was initially built in 1990 for use by SAS as a domestic terminal. The terminal was designed to enable short turnaround times for aircraft, increased efficiency, and short walking distances, then without security checks and with most passengers having only hand luggage and the ability to show up 10 minutes before departure. It had double walk bridges designed for both doors of MD-80. However, SAS decided to leave the terminal because of decreases in passenger traffic on domestic routes. For a while the terminal was used by other airlines including Transwede Airways for both domestic and international services, but the terminal is now used only for international flights. Security checks, a larger luggage claim area, more shops and restaurants have had to be added over the years, making the terminal fairly small. However, in 2013 it was extended with a new floor level, which now has restaurants and a lounge. Terminal 2 has 8 aircraft parking stands with passenger bridges. Terminal 2 has an express station for high-speed trains, Arlanda South Station, shared with terminal 4, but using its own escalator.
As of 29 May 2012, Norwegian relocated its international flights from Terminal 2 to Terminal 5 ousting Air France and Czech Airlines to Terminal 2.
In April 2013, British Airways and Finnair relocated to the newly renovated Terminal 2.
Terminal 2 was closed due to COVID-19 between March 2020–October 2021. After reopening, Air France, Czech, Easyjet, KLM, Transavia and Vueling use it.
There are buses between terminal 2 and terminal 5 without need for further security check.

Terminal 3 – Regional domestic (Arlanda South)
Terminal 3 (gates 51–59) was built in 1990 for regional aircraft. There is a café there. People walk outdoors from the gates and board the planes with airstairs. Access is through terminal 2, with a 200 m walking distance. As with terminal 2, it was built without security checks, which were added after 2001. There has been a decline in passenger numbers for smaller connections in Sweden.
Terminal 3 closed down in early 2020 due to COVID and is not used as of July 2022.

Terminal 4 – Domestic and International
Terminal 4, formerly Inrikes 1 (gates C30–C44) was originally designed for the Swedish domestic carrier Linjeflyg, and initiated in 1983. Linjeflyg and Scandinavian Airlines moved all operations from Stockholm–Bromma Airport to the new terminal at Arlanda in 1984. That was made to assemble the domestic and international departures between Scandinavian Airlines and Linjeflyg. Because of increasing popularity, the terminal soon got too small. For that reason, Inrikes 2 was set up for SAS, who moved all domestic flights from Inrikes 1 to the new terminal in 1990.
Because of a recession in Swedish economy SAS moved back in 1992 and again the two carriers shared the terminal. Also in 1992 the terminal got a new name, Terminal 4. Since 1999 the terminal has had an express station for high-speed trains, Arlanda South Station, connecting the terminal with Stockholm Central Station and Terminal 5. In 2006, the terminal underwent a major renovation, the first since it was built in 1983.
The terminal was closed in spring 2020 due to COVID-19 and reopened in June 2022 as a terminal used mainly by Ryanair. During the closure the construction of the already planned airside walkway connection to terminal 5 took place, connecting terminal 4 with terminal 5 for smooth transfers between the two terminals. There is no passport check in terminal 4, so non-Schengen Ryanair flights to cities such as  London actually use terminal 5. All Ryanair check-ins are in terminal 4 in any case. Also, there is no customs control in terminal 4, so all arriving passengers will have to walk 500 meters to terminal 5, also domestic since the customs has to see evidence that passengers travel domestic and don't need pass customs control.

Terminal 5 – Domestic and International (Arlanda North)
Terminal 5 (gates 1–24 & F26–F69) is the largest of the passenger terminals at the airport. From 2020 terminal 5 has both domestic, and  international flights. The terminal has three piers equipped with 31 aircraft parking stands with passenger bridges. There are also a number of remote aircraft parking positions serving the terminal. Terminal 5 has restaurants, bars and shopping areas. The first stage of the terminal was inaugurated in 1976. Terminal 5 has since been expanded with a new passenger pier F - this is after passport control for non-Schengen flights. By 2040 terminal 5 will be expanded with another pier, pier G, which will help the airport accommodate 40 million passengers compared with the 25 million of 2019. The new pier will be designed to handle bigger aircraft models such as the Airbus A380. In addition to the scheduled services listed, all charter flights are handled at Terminal 5. The terminal is (like terminal 4 and Sky City) connected to Stockholm Central station by high-speed trains.
Due to the COVID-19 outbreak all traffic, including domestic, moved to Terminal 5. After the other terminals (2 and 4) reopened, as of July 2022, all traffic of SAS and many other airlines remain in terminal 5, although some can be relocated to terminal 4 which has been interconnected to it with a walkway since 2022.

Cargo facilities
Stockholm Arlanda has extensive cargo flight activity. There is a cargo area with cargo terminals and cargo transit facilities in the southern part of the airport area. The cargo area is labeled "Cargo City" with warehouses operated by Cargo Center, DHL, Swedish postal service (Posten) and Spirit Air Cargo. A large part of mail and express parcels from Sweden is handled through the facilities at the airport. SAS Cargo has its cargo operation east of the passenger terminals close to the SAS hangars.

Dedicated scheduled cargo flights are operated by Korean Air Cargo with Boeing 747 cargo aircraft, as well as Lufthansa Cargo and Turkish Airlines. DHL, FedEx and UPS operate express freight services at the airport. West Air Sweden and Amapola operate shorter cargo sectors. A number of airlines operate ad hoc cargo flights with various equipment. Outsize cargo is frequently hauled with the Antonov An-124 and similar cargo planes. TNT had their operations at Arlanda but have since moved to Västerås Airport.

Other facilities
Swedavia, the Swedish airport management company, has its head office in the airport control tower facility. The company Sollentuna Cabin Interiors has its head office in Hangar 4 at Arlanda.

Oxford Aviation Academy has a flight simulator centre for some of the most common airliners of today (like Boeing 737) at Arlanda. Arlanda has hangars and aircraft maintenance facilities operated by SAS Scandinavian Airlines and Priority Aero Maintenance. TUI fly Nordic based at the airport also has a large hangar for widebody jets. There is also a helicopter repair facility operated by Patria Helicopters. A decommissioned Boeing 747 jumbo jet renovated into a hostel, the Jumbo Stay (formerly Jumbo Hostel), is located at the entrance to Arlanda Airport. There are four additional hotels at the airport (Clarion Hotel Arlanda Airport, Radisson Blu Arlandia Hotel, Radisson Blu SkyCity Hotel and Rest and Fly); in addition there are several hotels nearby with transfer buses.

Airlines and destinations

Passenger

Cargo

Statistics

In graph

In tables

{| class="wikitable" style="font-size: 90%" width=align=
|+ Countries with most handled passengers to/from Stockholm Arlanda Airport (2019)|-
! Rank
! Country
! Passengers
! Change2018/19
|-
| 1
| 
| 2,247,147
|  2.9%
|-
| 2
| 
| 2,120,906
|  6.3%
|-
| 3
| 
| 1,728,298
|  7.1%
|-
| 4
| 
| 1,656,803
|  3.1%
|-
| 5
| 
| 1,530,996
|  2.1%
|-
| 6
| 
| 1,487,883
|  7.7%
|-
| 7
| 
| 957,182
|  8.4%
|-
| 8
| 
| 898,214
|  0.0%
|-
| 9
| 
| 733,004
|  7.4%
|-
| 10
| 
| 708,073
|  18.2%
|-
| 11
| 
| 685,276
|  10.9%
|-
| 12
| 
| 542,304
|  14.3%
|-
| 13
| 
| 509,834
|  7.9%
|-
| 14
| 
| 366,508
|  1.2%
|-
| 15
| 
| 305,792
|  1.7%
|-
| 16
| 
| 302,936
|  10.7%
|-
| 17
| 
| 302,843
|  0.6%
|-
| 18
| 
| 288,900
|  22.6%
|-
| 19
| 
| 284,259
|  0.9%
|-
| 20
| 
| 282,846
|  0.4%
|}

Winter time operations and snow clearing

Arlanda has a policy to never close due to snowfall.  Arlanda is exposed to lake-effect snowfalls, where ice cold air from the northeast in combination with open water in the Baltic Sea causes heavy snowfall.  During heavy snowfall at least one runway stays open but in bad weather condition there may be delays even if flight operations continue at all times. Not just runways need to be cleared, aprons and aircraft parking areas need snow clearing as well. It is an advantage that there are three runways allowing two open runways when one is cleared at lighter snowfall. The airport has a total of 250 000 m2 to clear from snow and ice, at the same time as the aircraft continue taking off and landing. During the colder half of the year Stockholm Arlanda has about 65 seasonally hired snow removal staff. Together with permanent staff, they form a team of 100 people who provide snow removal services. Special routes are planned for sweeping teams, which clear each route at intervals of 35 to 45 minutes. The sweeping teams are directed via radio from the air traffic control tower. When snow removal is completed on each runway the surface is tested by a friction vehicle, which measures friction value. The airport announces the friction value, and then it is each pilot who decides whether the value is sufficient for a landing. The friction value determines how often a runway must be ploughed and treated with antiskid agent.

Aircraft hangars and maintenance facilities

SAS Technical Services, TUI fly Nordic and Priority Aero Maintenance. have large aircraft hangars and maintenance facilities at the airport. SAS Technical Services is headquartered at Arlanda and has hangar facilities suitable for widebody aircraft up to the size of Boeing 747-400s. The first part of the hangar complex was built to handle SAS' fleet of DC-8s. There are a number of positions on each side of the building initially built to handle the type. The hangar space are now used mostly for Boeing 737s and A320s. The Boeing 747 hangar was inaugurated at the time when Scandinavian Airlines received their first Boeing 747s in the beginning of the 70s. It is large enough to handle a Boeing 747 and two 737 sized airplanes at the same time. The offices of SAS Technical Services are situated in connection with the hangars. In the early days of the airport these hangars provided heavy maintenance for members of the KSSU group, which included KLM, SAS, Swissair and UTA. A number of other airlines, such as Thai Airways International, also maintained their aircraft in those hangars. Now the main user is Scandinavian Airlines. TUI fly Nordic has a hangar able to handle their largest aircraft, the Boeing 787-9.  Priority Aero Maintenance has its facilities in the eastern part of the airport. They provide heavy aircraft maintenance for a number of aircraft including MD-80, a common type to be overhauled by the company.

There is also a hangar in the southern part of the airport, built by the former Swedish domestic airline Linjeflyg. It is used mainly by regional aircraft.

Helicopter hangars and maintenance facilities are found at the very eastern part of the airport operated by Patria Helicopters.

VIP flights and services
Arlanda, as the main airport serving the Swedish capital, is also used by VIP-flights using business jets. Government officials and celebrities are frequent visitors. In April 2011, the then-Chairman of the Russian Government Vladimir Putin visited Stockholm with a couple of large jet airplanes. The Emperor of Japan has also visited Arlanda with his Boeing 747s. In September 2013, U.S. President Barack Obama, made an official visit to Sweden with Air Force One. EU-meetings and exhibitions in the Stockholm area also bring special flights to the airport. Various private companies use their business jets to attend meetings in the Stockholm area. Some VIP-flights also go to downtown Bromma Airport, but since Bromma has limited operational hours many go to Arlanda instead. European Flight Service has a Grumman Gulfstream G550 based at Arlanda for VIP flights.

Arlanda has several VIP lounges.  They allow travellers to meet their planes on the tarmac.  The VIP area can also hold weddings, with or without a flight.  The airport also holds weddings in the control tower.

Ground transportation
Rail

The fastest way to the airport from Stockholm Central Station is the Arlanda Express high-speed train service, making the trip in 20 minutes, in addition to other regional trains that make the trip in the same time.

The Stockholm commuter rail (Pendeltåg) serves Arlanda as well, with services going south to southern Stockholm, through Stockholm City, and services going north to Uppsala, but on Uppsala county tickets. The route takes 38 minutes between Arlanda C station and Stockholm C, and 18 minutes between Arlanda C and Uppsala C.   The fare is higher from Arlanda compared to other journeys on the commuter rail network because the railway to Arlanda is privately owned, with passengers over 18 having to pay a passage fee of 130SEK to enter or exit the airport.

Arlanda is also served by long-distance trains called Intercity, Regionaltåg (Regional train) and SJ Snabbtåg operated by SJ and Mälartåg that go to locations north of Stockholm Arlanda Airport and south of Stockholm. Some regional and Intercity trains allow passengers to board at Arlanda and get off at both Stockholm Central Station and Uppsala Central Station. Although the entrance fee to Arlanda Central Station increases the ticket price several times over, the long-distance trains can still often be cheaper than Arlanda Express while taking about the same time. (20 minutes)

All of these trains (except for Arlanda Express) depart from Arlanda Central Station.

There are plans to extend the Roslagsbanan commuter rail system to Arlanda, creating better connections with the north eastern parts of Stockholm such as Danderyd, Täby, and Vallentuna to the airport. There is no timeframe for its completion.

Bus
Flygbussarna, Flixbus, SL, UL, and Vy bus4you operate services to and from Arlanda. Flygbussarna operates frequent departures to Stockholm, while Flixbus and bus4you operate coach services to different destinations in Sweden. SL is the public transport operator of Stockholm Län, whilst UL is the public transport operator in Uppsala Län. SL operates a few bus lines to and from Arlanda, the most popular line being route 583 to Märsta railway station (from where SL commuter trains to Stockholm depart, for much cheaper than from Arlanda because of the exit fee charge there), which leaves every 10 minutes for the most of the day. UL operates bus lines from Arlanda to the neighboring Uppsala County, with the most popular line to Arlanda being route 801 to Uppsala, which leaves every 30 minutes between 04:00 and 01:00. UL also operates bus lines to Enköping (bus no. 579/803) and Almunge (bus no. 806). There are a few additional departures during peak times. An additional shuttle bus operates between Arlanda and the nearby Jumbo Stay hostel, located just outside the airport grounds.

Road
The motorway E4 goes past the airport and connects Arlanda with central Stockholm as well as Uppsala and other cities further north.
Terminal parking, short-term and long-term parking is available at the airport. The low price long-term parking requires a free shuttle bus ride. The bus departs every 8–15 minutes. There are rental car facilities at the airport.

Taxi
All taxi companies are required to offer fixed prices from the airport (one can still request use of the taxi meter). Most major companies also offer fixed prices to the airport.

Environment

There is an ongoing work to limit Arlanda's negative impact on the environment. In an effort to save electricity, buildings at Arlanda use district heating with biofuels and district cooling with water from a nearby lake. The take off charges for aircraft are partly based on the environmental performance of the aircraft and Arlanda is experimenting with Continuous Descent Approaches and landings, often referred to as "green landings". Jet fuel is since around 2006 delivered by boat to Gävle and via train to Brista close to Märsta and from there through pipeline. Previously fuel was delivered by ship to Värtahamnen in Stockholm and then by trucks through Stockholm city to Arlanda. The airport also takes measures to promote the use of bio fuel in taxis operating to and from the airport.

One of the most interesting eco-friendly systems Stockholm Arlanda Airport uses is their unique heating and cooling system for their hangar, terminals, and other buildings on the airfield. There innovative system uses a series of wells, linked to a large underground aquifer. The water from the underground source is plumbed up and into the facilities air system, which controls the temperature of the air coming from the vents. In the summertime, the underground water remains cooler than the surface. That allows the terminals to be cooled off without using extra energy that an air conditioner would require. Then, in the winter months, the underground water remains warmer than the surface. The water is then plumbed to a control/heating unit, which uses biofuel to heat the water to a temperature appropriate for warming up the buildings.

The heated water is also used to heat pads of cement on the ramp and near the large hangar doors, efficiently keeping the doors and ramps clear of ice. After the water is run through the system, it is then all replaced back into the aquifer to be used again. The unique aquifer system is one of Arlanda's most defining environmentally friendly designs.

Incidents and accidents
1 November 1969: A Linjeflyg Convair 440 registered as SE-BSU suffered an accident while being used for training purposes. After a simulated engine failure at takeoff the left wing contacted the ground and the aircraft crash-landed after the nose and main landing gear collapsed. None of the four persons on board were killed, but the aircraft was written off.
 5 January 1970: A Spantax Convair 990 registered as EC-BNM on a ferry flight from Stockholm Arlanda Airport to Zurich Airport (ZRH) crashed while climbing after take-off. The aircraft had been scheduled for a charter flight earlier in the day, but the flight was cancelled after the no. 4 engine developed trouble. The decision was made to ferry the aircraft using three engines to Zurich for repairs and the aircraft departed at 10:54 p.m. from runway 19 (currently runway 19R). Five of the 10 passengers and crew on board were killed and the aircraft was written off.
14 July 1973: A Sterling Airways Sud Aviation Caravelle registered as OY-SAN taxied into an obstruction and was written off as being damaged beyond repair.
25 January 1974: Scandinavian Airlines Sud Aviation Caravelle registered as OY-KRA was damaged beyond repair and written off.
26 May 1977: An Antonov 24 belonging to Aeroflot registered as SSSR-46806 on a scheduled flight from Donetsk Airport (DOK) to Riga Airport (RIX) was hijacked by a single hijacker who demanded to be taken to Sweden where the hijacker surrendered releasing the 23 passengers and crew.
27 February 1979: An Aeroflot Tupolev 154 on a flight from Oslo to Stockholm with a continuation to Moscow was taken over by three hijackers. After landing in Stockholm they were overpowered by the aircraft's crew.
6 January 1987: A Transwede Sud Aviation Caravelle registered as SE-DEC on a non-scheduled flight from Stockholm–Arlanda Airport to Alicante Airport (ALC) encountered problems after take-off most likely caused by ice. The aircraft hit the runway hard causing the landing gear to fail and the aircraft slid off the runway and caught fire. None of the 27 passengers and crew was killed but the aircraft was written off and subsequently used by the airport's ARFF as a fire and rescue training aircraft.
27 December 1991: Scandinavian Airlines Flight 751, a McDonnell Douglas MD-81, registered as OY-KHO, a scheduled flight from Stockholm–Arlanda Airport to Warsaw-Frederic Chopin Airport (WAW) with a stopover at Copenhagen-Kastrup Airport (CPH) crashed shortly after take-off because of a dual engine failure when clear ice, which had formed during the night, was not properly removed during de-icing, broke off and was ingested into the engines. None of the 129 passengers and crew was killed but the aircraft was written off.
 20 February 1993: A hijacker on board an Aeroflot Tupolev 134 on a scheduled flight between Tyumen Airport (TJM) and Saint Petersburg-Pulkovo Airport (LED) demanded to be taken to the United States. The aircraft first made a refueling stop in Tallinn where 30 passengers were released, and the aircraft was flown to Stockholm, where the hijacker demanded a larger aircraft to be flown to the U.S. After having released 12 more passengers, the hijacker, who was accompanied by his wife and child, surrendered, releasing the remaining 40 passengers and crew.
 7 October 1997: A BAC One-Eleven belonging to Tarom registered as YR-BCM on a scheduled flight from Bucharest-Otopeni International Airport (OTP) to Stockholm–Arlanda Airport suffered a failure of the nosewheel steering after touching down heavily on runway 26. As the airplane slowed down the commander discovered that he could not control the aircraft, which left the runway and continued into the grassy area to on the right side. The aircraft slowed down softly and when it came to a stop the passengers and crew were able to disembark using the normal exits. The aircraft was written off and taken to Halmstad by Le Caravelle Club to be used as a fire trainer.
 8 October 1999: A Saab 2000 belonging to SAS Commuter registered as SE-SLF called "Eir Viking" ran into a closed hangar door. At the time it was supposedly being taxied by two engineers or technicians.  The two people on board received some injuries and the aircraft was written off.
 25 September 2010: a PIA Boeing 777-200LR registered as AP-BGY'', flying from Toronto to Karachi, made an emergency landing at Stockholm Arlanda Airport after a phone call was made claiming a named passenger on board was armed with explosives. After the plane landed in Stockholm, it was parked at an emergency stand and the suspected passenger was removed from the plane by Swedish authorities. The rest of the passengers were also removed and the empty aircraft was searched. The plane and passengers were allowed to depart Sweden while the suspect was detained in the country for further investigation but later released after no evidence was found of the allegation made against him.

See also
Civil Aviation Administration (Sweden)
List of airports in Sweden
Stockholm Västerås Airport

References

External links

Airports in the Stockholm region
Metropolitan Stockholm
Transport in Stockholm
Sigtuna Municipality
Airports established in 1959
1959 establishments in Sweden
Space Shuttle Emergency Landing Sites
International airports in Sweden